Mount Uniacke is an unincorporated community in Hants County, Nova Scotia Canada. It lies about 40 km to the north of Halifax.

Uniacke Pizza, Uniacke District School, the Guardian Pharmacy, Eddies, Uniacke Library, Uniacke Pines Golf Course, Tim Hortons, Mount Uniacke Post Office and the Uniacke District Fire Department are all located in the small town of Mount Uniacke.

History
It is home of the Uniacke Estate Museum Park, the one time summer residence of Richard John Uniacke, Attorney General of Nova Scotia in the 19th Century.

Mount Uniacke was a popular area for the train riders of Mount Uniacke. Originally, an inn was placed in Mount Uniacke; however, the inn burned down in the 1970s. Another large hotel, the Parker Hotel, was located in Mount Uniacke. After the Parker Hotel was removed, a house was built. The house was abandoned and was eventually torn down. A mine was discovered on 18 June 1865 by Mr. Uniacke. The mine was in production from 1867–1941.

Notable people
 Buck 65 (Richard Terfry), hip-hop artist
 TJ king, country musician, went to school in Mount Uniacke.

Climate
Mount Uniacke has a humid continental climate (Dfb). Summers tend to be warmer and winters tend to be colder because of the community's location away from the coast. The climate is very wet year round, with almost half of all days receiving some form of precipitation.

References

 Mount Uniacke at the Atlas of Canada

External links
 The Uniacke Newsletter
 Uniacke Estate Museum Park

Communities in Hants County, Nova Scotia
General Service Areas in Nova Scotia